Events from the year 1592 in Sweden

Incumbents
 Monarch – John III then Sigismund

Events

 - Wedding between the King's brother Duke Charles and Christina of Holstein-Gottorp.
 17 November - John III is succeeded by his son, the Polish electoral monarch Sigismund III Vasa, which create a personal union between Protestant Sweden and Catholic Poland. This is opposed by both the Royal Council and Duke Charles, who unite against him.

Births
 17 January - Sigrid Banér, Swedish letter writer (died 1669) 
 - Clas Fleming (admiral), admiral and administrator  (died 1644) 
 October - Gustav Horn, Count of Pori, soldier and politician  (died 1657) 
 - Johan Björnsson Printz, governor  (died 1663) 
 - Johannes Matthiae Gothus, professor  (died 1670)

Deaths

 17 November - John III, monarch  (born 1537)

References

 
Years of the 16th century in Sweden
Sweden